The Women's Health Protection Act is a piece of legislation introduced in the United States House of Representatives aimed at expanding abortion rights established in Roe v. Wade and Planned Parenthood v. Casey. It was introduced in 2013 by Congresswoman Judy Chu and sponsored by Senator Richard Blumenthal. In the 117th Congress, the act was re-introduced in response to Whole Woman's Health v. Jackson and later Dobbs v. Jackson Women's Health Organization. It passed the House of Representatives, but it was defeated in the Senate on a 46–48 vote in February 2022 and a 49–51 vote in May 2022.

Among key facets of the bill include preventing governments from regulating abortions before fetal viability, or when the mother's life or health is at risk after fetal viability, and preventing government from restricting access to abortion services unless a compelling state interest has been shown in such restrictions. Violations would be investigated and prosecuted by the Department of Justice.

Legislative history

See also 
 Abortion in the United States
 United States abortion-rights movement

References 

Proposed legislation of the 117th United States Congress
Proposed legislation of the 116th United States Congress
Proposed legislation of the 115th United States Congress
Proposed legislation of the 114th United States Congress
Proposed legislation of the 113th United States Congress
Abortion-rights movement in the United States
United States proposed federal civil rights legislation